Amorgianoi is a village in the municipal unit of Inachos in Aetolia-Acarnania, Greece.  At the 2011 census the population of the village proper was 363 inhabitants, and 426 for the municipal district. The altitude of the village is 170 meters.  Some ancient ruins are located near the old village.

Litzos Christos and Georgios Mastoras or Salodimos or Amorgianiotis were two known persons from the village who participated in different battles during the struggle for independence of Greece (1821–1830).

Settlements
Amorgianoi
Malateika
Prantiko
Chamoriki

Population

External links
 Amorgiani on GTP Travel Pages

See also

List of settlements in Aetolia-Acarnania

References 

Domi Encyclopedia - Vol III - pg. 248 - Tegopoulou-Maniatea - Athens, 1996
 Stamatelatos M.& Vamva F. - Geographical Dictionary of Greece (Γεωγραφικό λεξικό της Ελλάδας) - Volume I, pg. 99 - To Vima - newspaper edition - Athens, 2006
3. Telonas N. - Oi promachoi tis patridos Valtinoi agonistes tou 21 - P. 145 @ 149 - Amfilochia 2004

Populated places in Aetolia-Acarnania